Amphorosteus is a dubious genus of mosasaur from the Late Cretaceous of North America.

See also

List of mosasaurs

External links
Mosasaur Translation and Pronunciation Guide

Mosasaurids
Mosasaurs of North America
Fossil taxa described in 1851
Nomina dubia